Mykola Mykolaiovych Zadorozhnii (born 5 December 1984) is a Ukrainian showman and politician currently serving as a People's Deputy of Ukraine from Ukraine's 162nd electoral district since 29 August 2019. He is a member of Servant of the People, and a former employee at Kvartal 95 Studio.

Early life and career 
He is a graduate of the Kryvyi Rih State Pedagogical University, and worked as a teacher in physics and information. Zadorozhnii has also worked as a showman for various events, including "GB Event by Kvartal 95". He was also a member of the Brothers Gagarin comedy routine  on the "Fight Club" television programme.

Political career 
In the 2019 Ukrainian parliamentary election, Zadorozhnii ran for the position of People's Deputy of Ukraine from Ukraine's 162nd electoral district as the candidate of Servant of the People. At the time of the election, he was an independent. He was successfully elected, winning 38.08% of the vote. His closest competitor, independent Ivan Lozovyi, got only 14.52%.

In the Verkhovna Rada (Ukrainian parliament), he is a member of the Verkhovna Rada Budget Committee. According to anti-corruption non-governmental organisation Chesno, as of February 2020 Zadorozhni had proposed the most laws of any People's Deputy from Sumy Oblast.

References 

1984 births
Living people
Ninth convocation members of the Verkhovna Rada
People from Dnipropetrovsk Oblast
Servant of the People (political party) politicians
Ukrainian male comedians